Out of Step is the sole studio album by American hardcore punk band Minor Threat. It was released on 45 RPM vinyl in April 1983 through Dischord Records. Although Out of Step has only been released on CD in limited quantities, it has been repressed on vinyl as recently as 2010, and all tracks from the album are available on Minor Threat's 1989 compilation album Complete Discography.

It is considered as an elementary piece of the punk rock (specifically hardcore punk) genre and has been cited by many critics and magazines as one of the best progressions for the history of rock music, which specifically helped shape the path of many genres of underground musical currents (alternative music). Its influence is notorious in future bands that would boost the youth crew movement, also in other genres such as grunge, post-hardcore, 90's skate punk and thrash metal, as well in the development of the New York hardcore music scene and aesthetics style.

This album’s increased complexity in songs, with more elaborate riffs and arrangements, is its main distinguishing factor compared to the band’s previous recordings. The bass octaves retain the dynamics of the guitar line. For this album Brian Baker became second guitarist and Steven Hansgen joined the bass.

The lyrics of the majority of the songs reflect self-reflection, youth frustration, personal problems and difficulties with friendships, in contrast to that of Minor Threat's first recordings (which contained a politically critical message and as opposed to drug use).

Background, recording and reissues

After a temporary break-up in 1982, Minor Threat entered Inner Ear Studios in January 1983 to record Out of Step. The album was produced and engineered by Don Zientara. The lyrics on Out of Step deal mainly with friendships and problems associated with them, unlike their previous recordings which were an outlet for MacKaye's message. The album artwork was drawn by Cynthia Connolly.

In May–June 1983, Southern Studios founder John Loder traveled from England to New York where Minor Threat would play a show, and there he offered the band to release Out of Step in the UK. The band knew that he was working with Crass which led them to accept the offer, starting a long-standing relationship between Dischord Records and Southern Studios.

The first vinyl pressing of the album (with plain black cover) appears on the Complete Discography compilation. After the second pressing, the band remixed the album and this version remained in print on vinyl until the 2000s. The latter is distinguishable by a colored stripe with suggested retail price across the front, and "Dischord 10 UK" and "Utopia" in the dead wax. The biggest differences between the original mix and the remixed version are in the songs "Out of Step" and the initially untitled "Cashing In".

In the mid-2000s, the album was remastered on vinyl by Chicago Mastering Service, with no stripe.

Reception

Critical reception

Out of Step was met with positive reviews and ratings. Ned Raggett of AllMusic awards it four-and-a-half out of five stars and states: "Building on the promise and fire of the band's earlier singles, Out of Step instantly became iconic for American hardcore, not to mention for the D.C. scene, for years to come, as well as any number of bands who conflated personal and social politics."

Legacy
Out of Step has received a number of accolades and is cited as a landmark album of the hardcore punk genre. It is mentioned in the book 1001 Albums You Must Hear Before You Die.

Track listing
All songs written by Minor Threat.

Personnel
 Ian MacKaye – lead vocals
 Lyle Preslar – lead guitar
 Brian Baker – rhythm guitar
 Steve Hansgen – bass
 Jeff Nelson – drums

Production
 Don Zientara; Minor Threat – producers
 Skip Groff – mixing
 Don Zientara − engineer
 Cynthia Connolly − cover art
 Jeff Nelson – graphic design

References

External links

Out of Step (Adobe Flash) at Radio3Net (streamed copy where licensed)

Minor Threat albums
1983 debut albums
Dischord Records albums